Zachary Burr Abel (born September 4, 1980) is an American actor. He is best known for portraying Carter Anderson in the ABC Family comedy drama series Make It or Break It (2009–2011). For his role, he was nominated for a Teen Choice Award for Choice Summer TV Star – Male.

Early life
Abel was born on September 4, 1980, in the small town of Middletown, Indiana. He studied finance and international business at Washington University in St. Louis.

Career
Abel began his acting career in 2007, when he appeared in an episode of the CBS police procedural drama series CSI: Crime Scene Investigation. He went on to star as Jonah Madigan in the web television drama series My Alibi (2008), a series produced by Take180. In 2009, he appeared in the ABC Family teen drama series The Secret Life of the American Teenager as Max Enriquez, the stepbrother of Adrian Lee. He also appeared as Chad in the horror film Forget Me Not (2009) and as Justin Palma in the comedy film Night Club (2011).

Abel gained further recognition for starring as Carter Anderson in the ABC Family comedy-drama series Make It or Break It, appearing on the series from 2009 to 2011. For his performance, he was nominated at the 2010 Teen Choice Awards in the category of "Choice Summer TV Star – Male", but lost to Ian Harding of Pretty Little Liars. Abel went on to make guest appearances in numerous other television series, including The Big Bang Theory (2009), 90210 (2010), Awkward (2011), The Secret Circle (2011), Agents of S.H.I.E.L.D. (2014), and Criminal Minds (2017).

Personal life 
He is in a relationship with English actress Elizabeth Henstridge. On 22 April 2019, they announced their engagement with an Instagram post. On 21 August 2021 the couple got married.

Filmography

Film

Television

References

External links
Official Twitter

1980 births
American male film actors
American male television actors
Living people
People from Henry County, Indiana
21st-century American male actors
Male actors from Indiana
Washington University in St. Louis alumni